Killer Frost is a name used by several female supervillains and superheroes appearing in comic books published by DC Comics: Crystal Frost, Louise Lincoln, and Caitlin Snow. Each different individual in the DC Universe assuming the Killer Frost persona usually has some connection to the superhero Firestorm.

Various iterations of Killer Frost, primarily Crystal Frost and Louise Lincoln, have appeared in various animated projects and video games, with a majority of them voiced by Jennifer Hale. Additionally, Danielle Panabaker portrayed Caitlin Snow and her Killer Frost persona eventually renamed Frost in The CW's Arrowverse franchise, such as the television series The Flash.

Fictional character biographies

Crystal Frost 
Crystal Frost was the first incarnation, first appearing in Firestorm #3 (June 1978). While Frost was studying to be a scientist in Hudson University, she fell in love with her teacher Martin Stein. While working on a project in the Arctic, Frost was upset to learn that Stein did not reciprocate her feelings; Stein told a fellow researcher that Frost was a withdrawn student and that Stein had merely tried to draw her out of her shell, which Crystal completely misinterpreted. Frost accidentally locked herself in a thermafrost chamber but survived, being transformed in a way in which she was able to absorb heat from a living being and project cold and ice. Calling herself "Killer Frost", she began her murderous crusade against men and clashed with Firestorm on many occasions. Killer Frost eventually died after she absorbed too much energy from Firestorm. She has been identified as one of the deceased villains entombed below the Hall of Justice. Her body was reanimated as a Black Lantern.

Louise Lincoln 
Dr. Louise Lincoln is the second incarnation; she first appeared in Firestorm (vol. 2) #21 (March 1984) and used the "Killer Frost" name in Firestorm (vol. 2) #34 (April 1985). Lincoln was a colleague and friend to Crystal Frost. After her friend's death, Lincoln decided to repeat the experiment as a last respect to her friend, with Lincoln herself as the second Killer Frost. Just as ruthless as her predecessor, she began her own personal vendetta against Firestorm whom she blamed for her friend's death. She briefly served as a member of the Suicide Squad and sold her soul to Neron for more power.

During the Underworld Unleashed event, Killer Frost attacked Hawaii, freezing part of the islands before being stopped by Superboy and Knockout.

After a group of mobsters put out a hit on Lois Lane, Killer Frost rescued Lois from Solomon Grundy, only to then leave the reporter bound and gagged on a set of train tracks, hoping to take the credit and reward for Lane's death. Her plan was foiled by Superman who rescued Lois before the train could hit.

Killer Frost was later freed when the DEO refrigeration truck transporting her crashed. Effigy happened upon the crash and she discovered the heat from Effigy's pyrokinetic abilities enabled her to kiss Effigy without him freezing over. The two had a brief flirtatious partnership that dissolved when Effigy lost patience with her lecturing on how to defeat Green Lantern. After Green Lantern buried them both under a mountain of snow, Effigy escaped and abandoned her to be apprehended again.

In the Superman/Batman "Public Enemies" arc, Killer Frost was one of many supervillains seeking to earn a $1 billion reward offered by President Lex Luthor to sanction Superman and Batman. She teamed with Mister Freeze, Icicle (Cameron Mahkent) and Captain Cold in an attempt to ambush the two heroes in Washington D.C., but all four were defeated. They attacked in a second wave, along with more villains such as Giganta and Gorilla Grodd, but a similar backup of superheroes battered them all into submission. It was later discovered that this ice-themed team of villains was being mind controlled by Grodd.

Dr. Light hired Killer Frost and Mirror Master to attack Green Arrow and Black Lightning at a hospital in Chicago, Illinois, where Kimiyo Hoshi was being held. Green Arrow stopped Killer Frost by firing an arrow filled with Greek fire into her thigh. Unable to absorb the heat from the arrow, she was defeated.

Around this time, Lincoln discovered that she had contracted cancer, and tricked Jason Rusch, the new Firestorm, into curing her. With her health and powers restored, Killer Frost went on a rampage, only to be defeated when Jason's abilities reversed the alterations to Lincoln's body, returning her cancer.

Killer Frost returned during the events of One Year Later, where she had apparently entered into a relationship with Mr. Freeze. Together, the two villains went on a killing spree in Manhattan, hoping to draw Firestorm into an elaborate trap. Once the hero arrived, Killer Frost used a device to send both of them into space, where she sought to absorb the heat energy of the sun. Firestorm narrowly managed to stop her plan, and both Killer Frost and Mister Freeze were taken into custody by Batman. As they were being sent away, Killer Frost angrily revealed to Mister Freeze that she had only been using her lover as a pawn, and had no romantic interest.

Killer Frost was later seen battling Firestorm in the Justice League of America Wedding Special until Lex Luthor, the Joker and Cheetah arrived, subdued Firestorm, and invited Killer Frost to join the new Injustice League. She then appeared in Salvation Run, where she was sent to the Prison Planet after having been defeated and captured by the Suicide Squad.

In DC Universe #0, she was seen as a member of Libra's Secret Society of Super Villains. She is later seen as one of the villains sent to retrieve the Get Out of Hell Free card from the Secret Six, and ultimately helped deal the killing blow to the crazed supervillain Junior and the troubled vigilante Tarantula. A short time after this encounter with the Secret Six, Killer Frost appeared as one of the participants in a metahuman fighting tournament in Tokyo. She was defeated by Wonder Woman and Black Canary who had disguised themselves as villains to take down the tournament from the inside.

The DC Rebirth version of Louise Lincoln debuts in the Watchmen sequel Doomsday Clock. While Firestorm considers "The Superman Theory" as a hoax, Killer Frost claims that Captain Atom, Firehawk, Moonbow, and Typhoon are the government's creations. Killer Frost later accompanied Black Adam's attack on the White House.

Caitlin Snow

The New 52 
In September 2011, The New 52 rebooted DC's continuity; Killer Frost is reintroduced in September 2013, as the "Villains Month" part of the Forever Evil – she was featured in the one-shot Justice League of America (vol. 3) #7.2, also titled Killer Frost #1. She can also be seen on the cover of Forever Evil #1, which hints at her involvement in that series where she's revealed to be Dr. Caitlin Snow, a scientist sent to S.T.A.R. Labs Outpost #72 in the Arctic to work on a thermodynamic engine whose creator had committed suicide. Snow soon discovered the place had been infiltrated by H.I.V.E. agents. When they tried to kill her inside the engine, Snow frantically ripped off the coolant system, merging her body with ice. Transformed into a heat vampire, she killed the H.I.V.E. agents out of revenge. She then wandered out into the cold until she came across a Norwegian camp and took their heat too. Hijacking a helicopter, she made it back to her hometown Pittsburgh. She even created a suit that helped her retain heat for longer. She later encountered the superhero Firestorm and discovered that his powers could temporarily heal her mutation. She tried recreating the Firestorm Nuclear Matrix several times, only to fail with each attempt. When Firestorm and the Justice League were declared dead by the Crime Syndicate, she lost hope for a cure to her condition.

Killer Frost later has the scientist Byte track down Martin Stein, the original creator of the Firestorm Matrix, to a secluded cabin while he had gone into hiding during the Crime Syndicate's takeover of Earth. She encountered Steve Trevor who was sent there on a mission to try to find the Justice League who were imprisoned inside Firestorm. Learning Stein was alive, Snow allied herself with the two men to find them. Soon they were attacked by supervillains Multiplex, Black Bison, Hyena, Tempest and Plastique for betraying the Crime Syndicate. While fighting them off, Frost, Stein, and Trevor teleported to another A.R.G.U.S. base, where they learned that to free the Justice League, they needed Wonder Woman's Lasso of Truth. Discovering Cheetah was keeping it as a trophy, they found her and her Menagerie, but were subdued. Doctor Light (Arthur Light) suddenly appeared and blasted everyone except Frost and Trevor unconscious. After defeating him, they managed to deliver the Lasso of Truth to Cyborg who successfully used it to free his teammates.

DC Rebirth 

In DC Rebirth, Caitlin Snow is taken to Belle Reve Penitentiary, where she is introduced to the Suicide Squad and offered a place on the team by Amanda Waller. She accepts and joins the team. She helps the Suicide Squad in their fight against the Justice League, but subsequently assists them against Maxwell Lord when he is possessed by Eclipso, whose attempt to tap into her "darkest desire" only unlocks her desire to make a difference. She then has to save all the Suicide Squad and the Justice League by absorbing the energy out of Superman and using it against Lord. Afterwards, Waller is forced to release Snow into Batman's custody. She then joined the new Justice League of America made up of Batman, the Atom, Lobo, Black Canary, Vixen and the Ray.

Powers and abilities 
All versions have shown the ability to absorb heat from external sources and transmute it into waves of cold. Using these powers, Killer Frost can create an ice-sheen across her entire body that grants her increased durability, cause intense blizzards that can instantly freeze the target and generate objects composed completely of ice, such as projectiles in the form of ice shards and defensive walls or shields. She can also instantly freeze animate matter through physical contact and is unable to touch a normal person without freezing them. Although she is able to kiss people who can cool her down and negate her cryo-kinetic abilities like Firestorm.

Her weakness is the need to absorb external heat sources to generate ice: although heat-based weapons such as flamethrowers only make her stronger, she can be imprisoned in cold surroundings such as being locked in a refrigeration truck or buried under a mountain of snow. The Caitlin Snow version of Killer Frost is constantly plagued by a hunger for heat, which can only be sated by absorbing the heat from a living being, a process which inevitably kills the victim. However, in recent stories she seems to have finally gotten it under control by only absorbing a tiny amount of heat from every person she touches, sparing them and leaving them otherwise unharmed. The Caitlin Snow and Louise Lincoln versions of the character have, albeit inconsistently, demonstrated the ability to fly, either by riding Arctic winds or through an unknown manner of self-propulsion.

While the exact limits of her abilities have yet to be established, how much power Frost can channel at once seems to depend on how much heat she has absorbed and stored in her body. For example, when she absorbed all the heat from Superman (whose body is supercharged by yellow solar energy) during a stand-off between the Justice League and the Suicide Squad, she was able to flash-freeze the entire League in a single blast.

It also seems that using up all the heat energy she has stored can put Frost's life in danger. If she does not feed in time, she even risks dying of "starvation".

The Caitlin Snow version also boasts a genius-level intellect, being S.T.A.R. Labs' youngest and brightest scientist prior to her transformation. She could solve complex equations easily, operate heavy energy generating machinery and appeared particularly skilled in the field of physics and research about energy. She once managed to create an ice prism with her powers that converted Superman's heat vision into a bright burst of sunlight to defeat Eclipso.

Several adaptations of the villain have also depicted the Crystal Frost and Louise Lincoln incarnations as having basic skills in melee combat which they use in conjunction with their powers as well as impressive agility, being able to perform maneuvers such as leaps or cartwheels with ease.

Other versions

DC Bombshells 
Killer Frost appears in the DC Bombshells continuity, which takes place during World War II. She serves Hugo Strange of the Nazi Regime alongside Penguin and a brainwashed Harvey Dent (who is eventually rescued by the Batgirls). While Penguin is in love with her, it's unknown if she truly reciprocates the same feeling. This version is Louise L'inconnue, who is of French and German descent. In 1870, her mother is killed by angry villagers for conceiving a child with a German man and was thrown into an ice-cold well to die with her child. Louise emerges from the well with blue skin and freezes all the villagers to death. She is later adopted by the Joker's Daughter, who trained her in magic and controlling her powers (while also giving her the chance to kill her father). After clashing with Baroness Paula Von Gunther, she expresses her desire to have the world filled with superhumans like her.

In other media

Television 

 The Louise Lincoln incarnation of Killer Frost appears in series set in the DC Animated Universe, voiced by Jennifer Hale. This version is motivated by a base desire to kill people and does not seem to care who she serves so long as she is afforded the opportunity to kill. 
 She first appears in the Justice League two-part episode "Secret Society" as a member of Gorilla Grodd's eponymous team, though they are eventually defeated by the Justice League.
 Killer Frost appears in Justice League Unlimited, having rejoined Grodd's Society as of the episode "I Am Legion". Prior to and during the two-part series finale "Alive!" and "Destroyer", Lex Luthor takes control of the Society, but Grodd launches a mutiny. Killer Frost initially sides with the latter before defecting to Luthor after he kills Grodd and freezes Grodd's remaining loyalists. After Darkseid attacks and kills most of the Society, Luthor, Killer Frost, and the surviving members join forces with the Justice League to defeat him.
 An amalgamated incarnation of Killer Frost appears in the teaser for the Batman: The Brave and the Bold episode "Darkseid Descending!", voiced again by Jennifer Hale. This version is identified as Louise Lincoln, wears Crystal Frost's attire, and is portrayed as Ronnie Raymond's vengeful ex-girlfriend.
 The Crystal Frost incarnation of Killer Frost appears in Young Justice, voiced by Sarah Shahi.
 The Caitlin Snow incarnation of Killer Frost appears in the Justice League Action episode "Freezer Burn", voiced by Mena Suvari. This version was caught in a freak accident involving "thermafrost", which turned her into Killer Frost, and is a fan of Mr. Freeze.
 An unidentified incarnation of Killer Frost makes non-speaking cameo appearances in Harley Quinn. This version's appearance resembles that of her counterpart from Batman: Assault on Arkham.

Arrowverse 

Danielle Panabaker portrays Dr. Caitlin Snow / Killer Frost, in media set in the Arrowverse. Following initial guest appearances in Arrow and primarily appearing in The Flash, this version is a member of the Central City-based S.T.A.R. Labs team alongside Cisco Ramon / Vibe and Harrison Wells, which supports Barry Allen / Flash.

In the first season, she struggles with her fiancé Ronnie Raymond's apparent death following S.T.A.R. Labs particle accelerator exploding and creating various metahumans before later discovering Raymond survived as part of Firestorm. Caitlin and Raymond later marry, but he gives his life to help the Flash close a singularity that opened over Central City. During the second season, Caitlin grieves for Raymond, but grows closer to Hunter Zolomon while he was disguised as Jay Garrick. When Zolomon reveals he has a disease that limits the use of his super-speed, Caitlin develops the Velocity serum to save his life. However, she and Team Flash soon discover Zolomon's true identity before he kidnaps her and takes her to Earth-2, where she meets her evil Earth-2 doppelganger, Killer Frost. Following this encounter, Caitlin begins to fear whether she has a capacity for evil as well.

Due to Allen altering the timeline while creating and undoing the "Flashpoint" timeline in the third season, Caitlin has developed cryokinetic abilities and an alternate, villainous personality, both of which she attempts to hide from her friends. She also develops a relationship with Julian Albert. Caitlin is advised by her mother, Dr. Carla Tannhauser, to not use her powers or her transformations will become irreversible. However, Catlin's abilities fully manifest when Albert removes her power-suppressing necklace so she can use her healing abilities to save herself, triggering her transformation into Killer Frost. Joining Savitar as his enforcer, Killer Frost battles Team Flash Albert gives her a cure he developed. She subsequently turns on Savitar and helps her friends defeat him before leaving to rediscover herself.

In the fourth season, Caitlin and Killer Frost develop a "Jekyll and Hyde"-esque relationship while the latter works to reconcile her dual personalities, giving herself the ability to switch between her two personas at will. Furthermore, Killer Frost begins to show a more heroic side and agrees to use her powers to help Team Flash. Later in the season, Caitlin discovers her powers and Killer Frost originated during her childhood and that she suppressed the memories.

In the fifth season, Caitlin discovers further that her father, Thomas Snow, experimented on her and himself in an attempt to cure their ALS genes, resulting in them both developing alternate personalities with cryokinetic powers. After he becomes Icicle, Caitlin and Killer Frost work together to save Thomas from his evil persona.

In the sixth season, Caitlin experiments with giving Frost more time with their shared body and allowing her to live her own life. In the seventh season, they become exposed to Eva McCulloch / Mirror Monarch's rays, which severs their telepathic connection and causes Frost's cells to replicate until she acquires her own body. As such, Caitlin and Frost decide to live separate lives as twin sisters.

In the eighth season, Killer Frost transforms into Hellfrost and gives her life to defeat Deathstorm. Having secretly taken a hair sample from Frost, Caitlin tries to resurrect her with Chillblaine's help by entering the Consciousness Resurrection Chamber, but the machine malfunctions, causing a new individual named Khione (also portrayed by Panabaker) to emerge in the ninth season.

Film 
 The Louise Lincoln incarnation of Killer Frost appears in Superman/Batman: Public Enemies, voiced again by an uncredited Jennifer Hale. This version is a member of the "Cold Warriors".
 The Louise Lincoln incarnation of Killer Frost appears in Batman: Assault on Arkham, voiced again by Jennifer Hale. She is recruited by Amanda Waller to join the Suicide Squad and break into Arkham Asylum to retrieve data stolen by the Riddler, though Waller secretly assigns Killer Frost to kill him. Over the course of the mission, the squad learns the Riddler can defuse the bombs Waller implanted in their necks to keep them in line and they successfully do so. Killer Frost attempts to escape in a police car, only for Bane to throw it some distance away and cause it to explode.  
 The Crystal Frost incarnation of Killer Frost appears in Suicide Squad: Hell to Pay, voiced by Kristin Bauer van Straten. This version is a "tough girl" whose powers manifested while she was young and used them to kill her abusive parents. She is recruited into Amanda Waller's Suicide Squad to retrieve a "Get Out of Hell Free" card, but is swayed by Professor Zoom into helping him get the card for himself. Killer Frost betrays Zoom, but is attacked by Copperhead and killed by Waller via Copperhead's nano-bomb.

Video games 
 The Louise Lincoln incarnation of Killer Frost appears as a playable character in Justice League Heroes, voiced by Nika Futterman.
 The Louise Lincoln incarnation of Killer Frost appears as a boss in DC Universe Online, voiced by Christina J. Moore.
 The Louise Lincoln incarnation of Killer Frost appears in Injustice: Gods Among Us, voiced again by Jennifer Hale. In an alternate reality, she sports Caitlin Snow's attire and serves as a member of Superman's Regime until they are defeated by a group of heroes from their Earth and the "prime" Earth. In her non-canonical arcade ending, Killer Frost becomes overconfident after defeating Superman and is captured by S.T.A.R. Labs scientists, who intend to use her to fortify the polar ice caps. However, she breaks free and freezes the entire Western hemisphere, leaving the survivors in a struggle to overthrow her.
 The Crystal Frost incarnation of Killer Frost appears as a boss in Young Justice: Legacy, voiced by Vanessa Marshall.

Lego 
 The Louise Lincoln incarnation of Killer Frost appears as an unlockable character in the portable version of Lego Batman 2: DC Super Heroes.
 The Caitlin Snow incarnation of Killer Frost appears as a downloadable character in Lego Batman 3: Beyond Gotham.
 The Caitlin Snow incarnation of Killer Frost appears in Lego DC Super-Villains, voiced by Jennifer Hale. This version is a member of the Legion of Doom.

Miscellaneous 
 The Crystal Frost incarnation of Killer Frost appears in #12 of Justice League Adventures as a member of the Cold Warriors alongside Mr. Freeze, Captain Cold, Minister Blizzard, Cryonic Man, Icicle, Polar Lord and Snowman.
 The DCAU version of Louise Lincoln / Killer Frost appears in  issue #21 of the Justice League Unlimited spin-off comic book.
 An unidentified incarnation of Killer Frost appears in issue #16 of DC Super Friends as a member of the "Ice Pack".
 The Injustice incarnation of Louise Lincoln / Killer Frost appears in the Injustice: Gods Among Us prequel comic.
 Caitlin Snow / Frost appears in DC Super Hero Girls, voiced by Danica McKellar. This version is a hero, student at Super Hero High, and roommate of Lady Shiva, Miss Martian and Star Sapphire.

References 

Articles about multiple fictional characters
Villains in animated television series
DC Comics superheroes
DC Comics female superheroes
DC Comics female supervillains
DC Comics television characters
Comics characters introduced in 1978
Comics characters introduced in 1984
DC Comics metahumans
Fictional characters from Pittsburgh
Fictional female doctors
Fictional mass murderers
Fictional rampage and spree killers
Characters created by Al Milgrom
Characters created by Gerry Conway
Fictional characters with ice or cold abilities
Fictional characters with absorption or parasitic abilities
Fictional characters with elemental transmutation abilities
Suicide Squad members